Kopidodon is a genus of extinct squirrel-like mammals belonging to the order Cimolesta. Kopidodon was one of the largest tree-dwelling mammals known from Eocene Europe: growing 115 centimeters long (most of that length is tail). This mammal sported large canine teeth, probably for defense, since its molars were adapted for chewing plants, not flesh. Its legs and claws allowed Kopidodon to scramble through the trees with the greatest of ease, much like modern-day squirrels. Its fossils were found in the Messel pit, preserving even its fur. Kopidodon had a thick bushy tail for balance.

References

Cimolestans
Eocene mammals
Eocene mammals of Europe
Fossil taxa described in 1902
Prehistoric mammal genera